Harsari is a village in West Champaran district in the Indian state of Bihar.

Demographics
As of 2011 India census, Harsari had a population of 1718 in 289 households. Males constitute 51.39% of the population and females 48.6%. Harsari has an average literacy rate of 54%, lower than the national average of 74%: male literacy is 64.47%, and female literacy is 35.52%. In Harsari, 19.9% of the population is under 6 years of age.

References

Villages in West Champaran district